Gênes  was a department of the French Consulate and of the First French Empire in present-day Italy. It was named after the city of Genoa. It was formed in 1805, when the Ligurian Republic (formerly the Republic of Genoa) was annexed directly to France. Its capital was Genoa.

The department was disbanded after the defeat of Napoleon in 1814. It was followed by a brief restoration of the Ligurian Republic, but at the Congress of Vienna the old territory of Genoa was awarded to the Kingdom of Sardinia. Its territory is now divided between the Italian provinces of Genoa, Piacenza, Alessandria and Pavia.

Subdivisions
The department was subdivided into the following arrondissements and cantons (situation in 1812):

 Genoa, cantons: Genoa (6 cantons), Rivarolo, Nervi, Recco, San Martino d'Albaro, San Quirico, Sestri Ponente, Staglieno, Torriglia and Voltri.
 Bobbio, cantons: Bobbio, Ottone, Varzi and Zavattarello.
 Novi, cantons: Novi, Gavi, Ovada, Rocchetta, Ronco, Savignone and Serravalle.
 Tortona, cantons: Tortona, Cassano Spinola, Castelnuovo Scrivia, San Sebastiano, Villalvernia and Volpedo.
 Voghera, cantons: Voghera, Argine, Broni, Casteggio, Codevilla, Sale, Silvano, Soriasco and Stradella.

Its population in 1812 was 400,056, and its area was 237,600 hectares.

References

Former departments of France in Italy
1805 establishments in the First French Empire
History of Genoa